Mohd Khairuddin bin Aman Razali (Jawi محمد خيرالدين بن أمان غزالي; born 9 December 1973) is a Malaysian politician who served as the Minister of Plantation Industries and Commodities in the Perikatan Nasional (PN) administration under former Prime Minister Muhyiddin Yassin from March 2020 to the collapse of the PN administration in August 2021 and Member of Parliament (MP) for Kuala Nerus from May 2013 to November 2022. He is a member of the United Malays National Organisation (UMNO), a component party of the Barisan Nasional (BN) coalition and was an independent as well as member of the Malaysian Islamic Party (PAS), a component party of the PN coalition. On 14 March 2022, Khairuddin left PAS effective immediately.

Background 

Mohd Khairuddin was born in Kampung Baru, Seberang Takir, Kuala Terengganu on 9 December 1973. He is the eldest of 16 siblings.

Education 

Early secondary education at the Sultan Zainal Abidin Religious Secondary School, Ladang, Kuala Terengganu in 1986. After achieving outstanding results in SRP in 1988, he was offered an offer at Klang Islamic College.  But the heart is bound to enter the flow of Thanawi which is fully Arabic in Sultan Zainal Abidin Religious Secondary School in Kuala Terengganu.

However, his education in the Thanawi stream could not be completed because after obtaining a successful SPM which he took privately in 1990, he was more than willing to go abroad to seek knowledge.  As a result, an offer to further his studies in 1992 to the University of Jordan was accepted.

Succeeded with a Bachelor of Arts degree in Arabic Language & Literature at the University of Jordan in 1996. His undergraduate degree continued and earned a Bachelor of Arabic Language and Literature at Aal al-Bayt University, Mafraq, Jordan in 2000. Master's thesis title he was  "Significant and Genetic Participatory Particles on the Syntax" (Signifikan Partikel Setara dan Genetif di sisi Sarjana Sintaksis) and "Scholar of Fiqh Proposals and their Influence on Syariah Text Understanding" (Sarjana Usul Fiqh serta pengaruhnya terhadap Kefahaman Teks Syarak) 

He then obtained a PhD in Islamic Studies (2011) at the Department of Arabic & Islamic Civilization, FPI, UKM with the thesis entitled:  "Waw Particle Rhetoric in the Qur'an and Its Influence on Translating the Meaning of the Qur'an into Malay (Retorik Partikel Waw Dalam al-Qur'an Dan Pengaruhnya Terhadap Penterjemahan Makna al-Qur'an ke Dalam Bahasa Melayu) . "

Engagement in Society 

Started lecturing on radio and TV since returning to Malaysia in 1999. Has been working on Arabic language programming  2000 on RTM Radio Nasional at 6.15pm for 3 years. Spoken at various slots on RTM Radio Nasional and IKIM Radio.  Also on TV1, TV2, TV3 and more. Likewise active in lectures, discussions, seminars throughout the country in mosques, suraus and government departments and ministries.  In 2004 founded Darul Fuqaha education and welfare center in Sg.  Merab Bangi, Selangor and Tahfiz Intellectual Islam in 2007. He is active as a Speaker (in mosques, TV and radio), Author (books, articles and papers), Publisher (Islamic books, Social Workers and Islamic Medical Practitioners).

Involvement in educational organizations 

1. Founder and chairman of Maahad Tahfiz Orphan Darul Fuqaha (2004–present)

2. Founder and chairman of the Smart Islamic Primary School Tahfiz Fuqaha (2008–present)

3. Chairman of Smart Islamic Primary School, Kuala Terengganu (2008–present)

Engagement in a missionary organization 

1. Member of Political Cluster, Islamic Consultative Council (2016–2018)

2. Founder and president of Nadwah Muslim Scientist (2007–2013)

3. Founder and chairman of the Malaysian Ummah Concerned Association (2013–2018)

4. Founder of Malaysian Islamic Book Publishers and Distributors (2008–2013)

5. Member of working committee of Malaysian Scholars Association (2007–2011)

Political career

Member of the Malaysian Islamic Party (PAS) (1989-2022) 

He first became active in PAS after leaving his educational career.  He is active in the PAS Legislative Council and has served in several capacities.  He served as Treasurer of the Central PAS Clerks in the 2009–2011 term, Secretary of the Central PAS Clerk of the House (2011–2013) and Head of Information of the Central PAS Clerks (2013–2017).  In addition, he has been a Member of the Central PAS Working Committee since 2013 to 2022.  As the PAS Central AJK, he has held portfolios as Chairman of the PAS Central Economic Development, Property and Entrepreneur Development (2013–2022), PAS Central Vice-Chair of International Poverty Law (2015–2017) and Director of the Central PAS Strategic Institute (2013–2022).  He has also been elected to the PAS Syura Syura Council since 2013 until 2022. On 14 March 2022, he resigned from PAS to be an independent politician after tendering his resignation letter to PAS Secretary-General Takiyuddin Hassan in Parliament.

Member of Parliament (MP) (since 2013) 

He is a member of parliament of Kuala Nerus, Terengganu who has been contesting on PAS tickets since 2013. In 2013, he defeated the incumbent Mohd Nasir Ibrahim Fikri with slim majority by 610 votes.

He retained the seat in 2018 after defeating a well-known Motivator Tengku Asmadi Tengku Mohamad from Barisan Nasional and Abdullah Mohamed from Pakatan Harapan with a wider majority by 8,447 votes.

Government official of state governments of Terengganu and Kelantan (2014-2020) 
Immediately following the end of the Malaysian General Elections 2018, the State of Terengganu is ruled by the PAS.  He has been appointed by Terengganu State Government to be the chairman of the board of 4 state-owned companies beginning 2018, namely the Terengganu Strategic & Integrity Institute (TSIS), Darul Iman Training Center (DITC), Paya Bunga Hotel, and Duyong Marina & Resort.  Earlier, he was appointed by Kelantan State Government as the Kelantan Government Economic Advisory Panel since 2014.

Minister of Plantation Industries and Commodities (2020-2021) 
On 1 March 2020, PN administration was formed with Muhyiddin Yassin as Prime Minister. On 10 March 2020, he was appointed as Minister of Plantation Industries by Muhyiddin.  He only served briefly in the position for 17 months in the PN administration. On 16 August 2021, PN administration collapsed and he was no longer a minister. On 21 August 2021, Barisan Nasional (BN) administration was formed with Ismail Sabri Yaakob as Prime Minister. However, he was not reappointed as a minister although his party and coalition are part of the administration.

International involvement 
He has been active in several international organizations including being a board member and Assistant Secretary of the International Conference of Islamic members of parliament (IIFP) from 2018 to the present.  He is also the Treasurer of the Youth Wing, International Conference on Asian Political Parties (ICAPP) from 2019 to the present.

Controversy 

He is known for his fellow Member of Parliament's claim that he brought in RM82 billion worth of investments for Malaysia while on a semi-personal trip to Turkey, and subsequently violated legally-mandated COVID quarantine procedures when he returned to Malaysia. In 2019, Malaysia's FDI was recorded at RM32 billion (US$8 billion). Upon investigation, he was fined RM1,000 (US$250) for violating quarantine, despite the usual fine being up to RM8,000 (US$2,000) and a day's jail. Popular speculations on his hudhud-like political survivability point to the fact that the sitting Prime Minister Muhyiddin Yassin has a narrow, 2-seat majority in Parliament and any fines above RM2,000 (US$500) would have disqualified Dato' Dr. Mohd Khairuddin of his position in the Parliament, thus further weakening the Prime Minister's majority and achieving the intention of Muhyiddin Yassin of not wanting to be the Prime Minister in the first place.

Election results

Honours
  :
 Knight Companion of the Order of the Crown of Pahang (DIMP) – Dato' (2013)

References 

1973 births
Living people
Malaysian Muslims
Malaysian people of Malay descent
Members of the Dewan Rakyat
Former Malaysian Islamic Party politicians
People from Terengganu
United Malays National Organisation politicians